"In My Life" is a 1965 song by the Beatles.

In My Life may also refer to:

Film and theatre 
 In My Life (1978 film), a Danish drama by Bille August
 In My Life (2009 film), a Filipino drama starring Vilma Santos-Recto
 In My Life (musical), a 2005 Broadway musical by Joseph Brooks

Music

Albums 
 In My Life (Cilla Black album), 1974
 In My Life (George Lamond album), 1992
 In My Life (George Martin album), 1998
 In My Life (Judy Collins album), 1966
 In My Life (Kevin Kern album), 1999
 In My Life (Marian McPartland album), 1993
 In My Life: Greatest Hits or the title song (see below), by Stephanie Mills, 1985
 In My Life, by Ariel Rivera, 2001
 In My Life, by Patti Austin, 1983

Songs 
 "In My Life" (Divinyls song), 1984
 "In My Life" (The Rasmus song), 2003
 "In My Life", by the Brian Jonestown Massacre from Take It from the Man!, 1996
 "In My Life", by Glen Campbell from Still Within the Sound of My Voice, 1987
 "In My Life", by Juvenile from Juve the Great, 2003
 "In My Life", by Kim Wilde from The Singles Collection 1981–1993, 1993
 "In My Life", by Nelly from Suit, 2004
 "In My Life", by the Real Milli Vanilli from The Moment of Truth, 1991
 "In My Life", by Stephanie Mills from I've Got the Cure, 1984
 "In My Life", from the musical Les Misérables, 1980

See also 
 In My Lifetime (disambiguation)
 It's My Life (disambiguation)
 My  Life (disambiguation)
 The Story of My Life (disambiguation)
 This Is My Life (disambiguation)